is a Japanese manga series written and illustrated by  Miyabi Fujieda. The manga was serialized between the first and last issues of the now-defunct Dengeki Teioh, a special edition version of Dengeki Daioh, from April 26, 2004 until November 26, 2006, and was published by MediaWorks. The series contains twelve chapters released in two bound volumes originally published under MediaWorks Dengeki Comics EX label. The manga has been licensed for English language distribution by Infinity Studios. The first volume in English was published on June 15, 2007, but the series was canceled before volume two was released.

Plot
The series is about Iono, the queen of a small European kingdom with a fetish for black-haired women, who comes to Japan to recruit , which can mean both "lady-in-waiting" and "concubine" in Japanese.

References

External links
Iono-sama Fanatics at Infinity Studios
Iono-sama Fanatics at Miyabi Fujieda's personal website 

2004 manga
ASCII Media Works manga
Dengeki Comics
Romantic comedy anime and manga
Seinen manga
LGBT harem anime and manga
Yuri (genre) anime and manga